December 18 - Eastern Orthodox liturgical calendar - December 20

All fixed commemorations below celebrated on January 1 by Orthodox Churches on the Old Calendar.

For December 19th, Orthodox Churches on the Old Calendar commemorate the Saints listed on December 6.

Saints
 Martyr Boniface of Tarsus, at Tarsus in Cilicia (290) and Righteous Aglae (Aglais, Aglaida) of Rome. (c. 303)
 Martyrs Meuris and Thea in Palestine (307).
 Martyrs Elias, Probus, and Ares the Egyptians, in Cilicia (308)
 Martyrs Polyeuctus at Caesarea in Cappadocia, and the Deacon Timothy at Mauretania, by fire (309)
 Martyrs Eutychios and Thessaloniki, and with them 200 men and 70 women, by the sword.
 Martyr Tryphon, by hanging.
 Hieromartyr Capito (Capiton), Bishop of Cherson (4th century)
 Saint Gregentios of Himyaritia (Gregentius of Himyar, Gregentios of Taphar, Gregory of Omirits), Missionary Archbishop of Zafar (capital of the Himyarite tribal confederacy) (552)
 Saint Boniface the Merciful, Bishop of Ferentino (6th century)
 Saints George the Scribe, and Sabbas, monks of Khakhuli Monastery (11th century)

Pre-Schism Western saints
 Saint Fausta of Sirmium, the mother of St Anastasia of Sirmium (3rd century)
 Saint Anastasius I, Pope of Rome (401)
 Saint Avitus (or Adjutus), Abbot of Micy near Orleans in France, an abbot renowned for the spirit of prophecy (c. 527)
 Saint Gregory of Auxerre, the twelfth bishop of Auxerre in France and Confessor (c. 540)
 Saint Ribert (Ribarius), seventeenth Abbot of Saint-Oyend in France, he is venerated in Franche-Comté (c. 790)
 Saint Manirus of Scotland, one of the Apostles of the north of Scotland (824).

Post-Schism Orthodox saints
 Venerable Elias of Murom, Wonderworker of the Kiev Caves (1188)
 Saint Seraphim (Romantsov), Schema-Archimandrite of Sukhumi, Abkhazia, Elder of Glinsk Monastery (1975)

Other commemorations
 Repose of Blessed Hieromonk Hermogenes, founder of Kirensk and Albazin Monasteries in Siberia (1690)

Icon gallery

Notes

References

Sources
 December 19/January 1. Orthodox Calendar (PRAVOSLAVIE.RU).
 January 1 / December 19. HOLY TRINITY RUSSIAN ORTHODOX CHURCH (A parish of the Patriarchate of Moscow).
 December 19. OCA - The Lives of the Saints.
 The Autonomous Orthodox Metropolia of Western Europe and the Americas (ROCOR). St. Hilarion Calendar of Saints for the year of our Lord 2004. St. Hilarion Press (Austin, TX). p. 1.
 December 19. Latin Saints of the Orthodox Patriarchate of Rome.
 The Roman Martyrology. Transl. by the Archbishop of Baltimore. Last Edition, According to the Copy Printed at Rome in 1914. Revised Edition, with the Imprimatur of His Eminence Cardinal Gibbons. Baltimore: John Murphy Company, 1916.
Greek Sources
 Great Synaxaristes:  19 ΔΕΚΕΜΒΡΙΟΥ. ΜΕΓΑΣ ΣΥΝΑΞΑΡΙΣΤΗΣ.
  Συναξαριστής. 19 Δεκεμβρίου. ECCLESIA.GR. (H ΕΚΚΛΗΣΙΑ ΤΗΣ ΕΛΛΑΔΟΣ). 
Russian Sources
  1 января (19 декабря). Православная Энциклопедия под редакцией Патриарха Московского и всея Руси Кирилла (электронная версия). (Orthodox Encyclopedia - Pravenc.ru).
  19 декабря (ст.ст.) 1 января 2013 (нов. ст.). Русская Православная Церковь Отдел внешних церковных связей. (DECR).

December in the Eastern Orthodox calendar